Cempuis is a commune in the Oise department in northern France.

Geography
Village is situated on the plateau of Picardie near Grandvilliers

History
A knight from Cempuis was first written about in the 12th Century.

Sights
Prévost orphanage: The first mixed orphanage in France founded by Paul Robin, who was the director from 1880 to 1894. Since being managed by the Seine département, it is now managed by the Fondation d'Auteuil.

Saint-Nicolas church: 14th Century choir, Vaulted chapel from the Renaissance period. Wooden carvings from the eighteenth century. Stature of Christ in wood from the fifteenth century.

ECCE HOMO chapel: Built in 1728, situated in the center of the lower village.

Wells: The village has underground chambers that were reinforced but damaged and filled in due to earth movements. It is said that the 100 wells or "cent-puits" in French that gave access to some of these chambers was the origin of the name of the village.

Below, four of the many wells that are to be found in the village.

Below, Aerial view of Cempuis - Looking towards the North East.

See also
 Communes of the Oise department

References

External links

 Official website
 Paul Robin and the orphanage

Communes of Oise